TV 2 Fri is a Danish leisure and outdoor television channel launched on May 5, 2013.

Cecilie Hother is one of the main hosts on the channel, presenting Frihuset in Hornsherred, from where the daily program is broadcast live.

References

External links
 

Television stations in Denmark
Television channels and stations established in 2013
2013 establishments in Denmark
Mass media in Odense